The 1978–79 Midland Football League was the 79th in the history of the Midland Football League, a football competition in England.

Premier Division

The Premier Division featured 17 clubs which competed in the previous season, along with two new clubs:
Appleby Frodingham, joined from the Lincolnshire League
Spalding United, transferred from the United Counties League

League table

Division One

Division One featured 14 clubs which competed in the previous season, along with two new clubs:
Creswell Colliery, joined from the Sutton & Skegby League
Grantham reserves

League table

References

Midland Football League (1889)
8